Radio 5 is a Spanish free-to-air radio station owned and operated by Radio Nacional de España (RNE), the radio division of state-owned public broadcaster Radiotelevisión Española (RTVE). It is the corporation's all-news radio station, and is known for its 24-hour rolling news service and its live coverage of breaking news.

It was launched in 1 January 1989 as the first 24-hour rolling radio news service in Spain. It was known as "Radio 5 Todo Noticias" (1994–99) and "Radio 5 Información" (2012–13). It is the only nationwide rolling news radio service in Spain.

Its headquarters and main production center is in Casa de la Radio at Prado del Rey in Pozuelo de Alarcón. Although almost all its programming is in Spanish and is the same for all of Spain, RNE has territorial centers in every autonomous community and produces and broadcasts some local news bulletins in regional variations in each of them in the corresponding co-official language.

History
It began broadcasting on 1 January 1989, following a reorganization of public radio services that took place after the dissolution of Radiocadena Española, and in its early years it included both conventional and local entertainment programming. In 1994, when Jesús Vivanco was director of the station, it adopted the format of a news radio station specializing in public service and current affairs under the name Radio 5 Todo Noticias.

From a June-2016 survey, Radio 5 received 289,000 listeners daily. According to EGM Radio 5, in June 2019 it had 238,000 daily listeners.

News schedule 
Every 30 minutes, Radio 5 broadcasts a 5-minute news bulletin. Headlines are broadcast at :15 and :45, followed by traffic from Dirección General de Tráfico and weather from Agencia Estatal de Meteorología.

An international news roundup, known as Cinco continentes (Five continents), is broadcast weekdays at 9–10pm.

Regional information is on at these times: 7:25–7:30am, 7:50–8am, 9:05–9:10am, 12:25–12:30pm, 1:10–2pm, 4:25–4:30pm and 7:35–8pm (weekdays), also 1:30–2pm (weekends). Provincial information is at 8:45–9am and 9:30–9:45am.

Radio 5 and Radio Nacional broadcasts together these programs: Las mañanas de RNE (6–8:30am), Diario de las Dos (1–1:10pm and 2–3:05pm), 24 Horas (8pm – midnight), top-of-the-hour news bulletins, morning regional information and Saturday morning timeslots.

Directors 

 Jesús Vivanco
 Gabriel Sánchez Rodríguez
 Juan Izquierdo
 Juan Carlos Morales
 Pedro Roncal
 Remedios Villa
 María Luisa Moreno de Viana Cárdenas
 Pedro Carreño
 José María Forte
 Fernando Martín (current)

Selected frequencies

Former logos

See also
 Radio Nacional de España
 List of radio stations in Spain

References

External links
  

RTVE
Radio stations established in 1989
Radio stations in Spain
1989 establishments in Spain
News and talk radio stations